The canton of Saint-Lô-2 is an administrative division of the Manche department, northwestern France. It was created at the French canton reorganisation which came into effect in March 2015. Its seat is in Saint-Lô.

It consists of the following communes:

La Barre-de-Semilly
Baudre
Bourgvallées
Canisy
Carantilly
Dangy
La Luzerne
Quibou
Sainte-Suzanne-sur-Vire
Saint-Lô (partly)
Saint-Martin-de-Bonfossé

References

Cantons of Manche